Steuben County (stu-BEN)  is a county located in the U.S. state of New York. As of the 2020 census, the population was 93,584. Its county seat is Bath. Its name is in honor of Baron von Steuben, a Prussian general who fought on the American side in the American Revolutionary War, though it is not pronounced the same.

Steuben County comprises the Corning, NY Micropolitan Statistical Area, which is also included in the Elmira-Corning, NY Combined Statistical Area.

History

Ontario County was established in 1789 to govern lands the state of New York had acquired in the Phelps and Gorham Purchase; at the time it covered the entirety of Western New York. Steuben County, much larger than today, was split off from Ontario County on March 8, 1796. In 1823 a portion of Steuben County was combined with a portion of Ontario County to form Yates County. Steuben County was further reduced in size on April 17, 1854, when a portion was combined with portions of Chemung and Tompkins counties to form Schuyler County.

Although it is not much mentioned because it does not fit well into the standard narrative of New York State history, in its earliest years Steuben County was demographically and geographically linked to the Susquehanna River basin in Pennsylvania, leading to the port of Baltimore. The Canisteo River, navigable as far as Arkport, emptied into the Chemung River and it into the Susquehanna. There were no natural barriers, like the Cohoes Falls on the Mohawk, to impede transportation, and timber and other agricultural products were easily shipped downriver from what are today (2019) the towns of Addison, Canisteo, and Hornellsville. Prior to the opening of the Erie Canal in 1825, followed by the railroads, communication with the Hudson Valley and New York City was difficult. Limited to horses, mules, and donkeys, it was far too expensive to be used to ship bulky agricultural products.

In 1892 a bill was introduced in the Legislature to split Steuben County, with Canisteo, Corning, and "the south towns" becoming Lincoln County. It did not pass.

Geography

Steuben County is in the southwestern part of New York State, immediately north of the Pennsylvania border.  The population of Steuben County according to the 2000 U. S. census was  98,726.  The county is in the Southern Tier region of New York State.

Adjacent counties

 Ontario County - north
 Yates County - northeast
 Schuyler County - east
 Chemung County - east
 Tioga County, Pennsylvania - south
 Potter County, Pennsylvania - southwest
 Allegany County - west
 Livingston County - northwest

Government and politics
Steuben County is governed by a 17-member legislature headed by a chairman

State and federal government

|}

Steuben County is part of:
 The 7th Judicial District of the New York Supreme Court
 The 4th Department of the New York Supreme Court, Appellate Division

Demographics

As of the census of 2000, there were 98,726 people, 39,071 households, and 26,216 families residing in the county.  The population density was 71 people per square mile (27/km2).  There were 46,132 housing units at an average density of 33 per square mile (13/km2).  The racial makeup of the county was 96.43% White, 1.36% African American, 0.27% Native American, 0.90% Asian, 0.02% Pacific Islander, 0.21% from other races, and 0.81% from two or more races. Hispanic or Latino of any race were 0.81% of the population. 18.6% were of German, 15.2% English, 14.4% American, 13.6% Irish and 8.3% Italian ancestry according to Census 2000. 96.5% spoke English and 1.3% Spanish as their first language.

There were 39,071 households, out of which 31.80% had children under the age of 18 living with them, 51.70% were married couples living together, 10.60% had a female householder with no husband present, and 32.90% were non-families. 27.20% of all households were made up of individuals, and 11.90% had someone living alone who was 65 years of age or older.  The average household size was 2.49 and the average family size was 3.01.

In the county, the population was spread out, with 26.00% under the age of 18, 7.40% from 18 to 24, 27.20% from 25 to 44, 24.20% from 45 to 64, and 15.20% who were 65 years of age or older.  The median age was 38 years. For every 100 females there were 96.00 males.  For every 100 females age 18 and over, there were 93.20 males.

The median income for a household in the county was $35,479, and the median income for a family was $41,940. Males had a median income of $32,155 versus $24,163 for females. The per capita income for the county was $18,197.  About 9.90% of families and 13.20% of the population were below the poverty line, including 18.70% of those under age 18 and 5.80% of those age 65 or over.

2020 Census

Industry
The largest employer in Steuben County is Corning, Inc. (formerly Corning Glass Works), the world headquarters of a large firm (34,000 employed worldwide) which manufactures specialty glass and related products. Related is the nearby Corning Museum of Glass. There is a wine industry in Hammondsport, also the headquarters of the Mercury Corporation, a custom manufacturer, formerly of aircraft and aircraft components. There is a museum of aviation, the Glenn H. Curtiss Museum, in Hammondsport. Former industries in Steuben County are the Steuben Glass Works, in Corning, and the Erie Railroad repair shops, in Hornell.

Education
There is one institution of post-secondary education in Steuben County: Corning Community College. Alfred University and Elmira College are nearby.

Transportation

Major highways

  Interstate 86 (Southern Tier Expressway)
  New York State Route 17 (Southern Tier Expressway)
  Interstate 99
  U.S. Route 15
  Interstate 390
  New York State Route 15
  New York State Route 21
  New York State Route 36
  New York State Route 414
  New York State Route 415
  New York State Route 417

Airports
Steuben County contains the following public-use airports:
 Corning-Painted Post Airport in the Town of Erwin, near Corning and Painted Post
 Hornell Municipal Airport in the City of Hornell

Public Transportation
Local bus service is provided by Hornell Area Transit.

Communities

Larger Settlements

† - County Seat

†† - Former Village

‡ - Not Wholly in this County

Towns

 Addison
 Avoca
 Bath
 Bradford
 Cameron
 Campbell
 Canisteo
 Caton
 Cohocton
 Corning
 Dansville
 Erwin
 Fremont
 Greenwood
 Hartsville
 Hornby
 Hornellsville
 Howard
 Jasper
 Lindley
 Prattsburgh
 Pulteney
 Rathbone
 Thurston
 Troupsburg
 Tuscarora
 Urbana
 Wayland
 Wayne
 West Union
 Wheeler
 Woodhull

Hamlets
 Adrian
 Canisteo Center
 Gibson
 South Hornell
 South Canisteo

Notable people
People born in Steuben County:
Stanley C. Armstrong (1888-1950), politician
Josiah H. Bonney (1817-1887), politician
Olive Byrne (1904-1990), domestic partner
Edward Conner (1829-1900), republican
Jasper Humphrey (1812-1892), democrat
Artemas Martin (1835-1918), mathematician
Selwyn N. Owen (1836-1916), lawyer
James A. Parsons (c.1868-1945), politician
Omar L. Rosenkrans (1843-1926), republican
Eric M. Smith (born 1980), juvenile murderer
Peter Truax (1828-1909), philanthropist

See also

 Steuben County Transit System
 Corning Museum of Glass
 Corning Community College
 List of counties in New York
 National Register of Historic Places listings in Steuben County, New York
 Corning Incorporated

Footnotes

Further reading
 Clayton, W. W., History of Steuben County, New York. Philadelphia: Lewis, Peck & Co., 1879.
 Sherer, Richard, (ed.) Steuben County: The First 200 Years, A Pictorial History. Virginia Beach, VA: The Donning Company, 1996.
 Stromquist, Shelton, "'Our Rights as Workingmen': Class Traditions and Collective Action in a Nineteenth-Century Railroad Town, Hornellsville, New York, 1869-82," in David O. Stowell (ed.), The Great Strikes of 1877. Urbana, IL: University of Illinois Press, 2008; pp. 55–75.

External links

  Steuben County, New York official government site
 
  Painted Hills Genealogy Society, Steuben County Page It contains a great deal of info on Steuben County.

 
Counties of Appalachia
1796 establishments in New York (state)
Populated places established in 1796